Broomhall Castle was originally built in 1874 by John Foukes and Frances Mackison for James Johnstone. It is situated in Menstrie, Clackmannanshire, Scotland on the Ochil Hills and consists of three storeys and a tower.

In 1906 the wealth of the builder declined, and the Castle was sold to an Italian Riding School. In 1910 it became the Clifford Park Boys Prep School. On Friday 28th June 1940 the building caught fire whilst the boarders were camping in the grounds.  Despite the efforts of the Alloa Fire Brigade the building was gutted. There was a spectacular scene when the roof fell in, sending a shower of sparks heavenwards.
It was left in ruins until 1985 when it was rebuilt and turned into a nursing home.
In 2003 it was purchased by the current owners, who turned it into a small hotel. It is currently in use as a 16 bedroom hotel, with restaurant and lounge.
In the summer of 2022 Broomhall Castle went into liquidation.

External links
Broomhall Castle

References

Castles in Clackmannanshire